Amal Acharjee is an Indian politician from the state of West Bengal. He is a member of All India Trinamool Congress representing the Itahar (Vidhan Sabha constituency) in the West Bengal Legislative Assembly for two terms.

Constituency
He represents the Itahar (Vidhan Sabha constituency) that he won in 2011 defeating Srikumar Mukherjee from the Communist Party of India.

Political party  
He is from the All India Trinamool Congress.

References

External links 
West Bengal Legislative Assembly

West Bengal MLAs 2011–2016
West Bengal MLAs 2016–2021
Living people
Trinamool Congress politicians from West Bengal
Place of birth missing (living people)
Year of birth missing (living people)